Otto Ernst Vinzent Leo von Below (18 January 1857 – 15 March 1944) served as a Prussian general officer in the Imperial German Army during the First World War (1914–1918). He arguably became most notable for his command, along with the Austro-Hungarian commander Svetozar Borojević, during the victorious Battle of Caporetto in October–November 1917.

Pre-war
Von Below was born in Danzig (now Gdańsk). Before the war broke out, he was promoted Generalmajor in 1909 and Generalleutnant in 1912. He was commanding the 2nd Infantry Division immediately prior to the outbreak of war.

First World War

Eastern Front
On 1 August 1914, at the outbreak of the First World War, Below was given command of I Reserve Corps as part of 8th Army on the Eastern Front. He led his Corps in the Battles of Gumbinnen, Tannenberg, and the Masurian Lakes. As a result of his successes, he was promoted to General der Infanterie at the end of August 1914 and to command of 8th Army at the beginning of November.

Below commanded the 8th Army in the Second Battle of the Masurian Lakes (February 1915) and the Army of the Niemen (later renamed 8th Army) in the Courland Offensive (May 1915). His forces advanced into Courland and Lithuania as far as the southern reaches of the Western Dvina River.

Macedonia
In October 1916, Below was appointed to the command of Heeresgruppe Below on the Macedonian Front, consisting of the German 11th Army and the First & Second Bulgarian Armies. In April 1917, he was briefly sent to the Western Front to command 6th Army around Lille.

Italy
Below next served on the Italian Front from September 1917. Commanding the Austro-German 14th Army (seven German and ten Austro-Hungarian divisions) in the Battle of Caporetto, his units were able to break into the Italian front line and rout the Italian army, which had practically no mobile reserves. The battle was a demonstration of the effectiveness of the use of stormtroopers and the infiltration tactics developed in part by Oskar von Hutier. The use of poison gas by the Germans played a key role in the collapse of the Italian Second Army. A breakdown in German logistics brought the battle to a close on the line of the Piave River and the front soon froze again in trench warfare.

Western Front
In February 1918, Below was brought back to the Western Front to command the new 17th Army for the Kaiserschlacht Offensive. Below was expected to overrun Arras during March 1918 in a repeat of Caporetto; his inability to do so led to the failure of the German campaign to capture the Somme that same month. Attacking the stronger, better prepared British Third Army, he had less success than forces further south facing the British Fifth Army.

In January 1918, he made the following revolutionary proposal to Ludendorff: "Forget about the offensive and shorten the front lines as much as necessary; build Panzers throughout all of 1918 and, with your Panzer squadrons, break through all the way to the Channel coast in the Spring of 1919". Below briefly commanded the 1st Army. Shortly before the war's end, Below was involved in preparations for a possible final battle on German territory (Home Defense Forces West).

Awards
Below was awarded the Pour le Mérite on 16 February 1915 "for outstanding leadership and distinguished military planning and successful operations", and the Oakleaves (signifying a second award) on 27 April 1917. Below was also awarded the Order of the Black Eagle on 1 November 1917 and the Iron Cross, 1st and 2nd class.

Post-war
Below retired in 1919. A post-war attempt by the Allies to try him as a war criminal failed. Otto von Below died on 9 March 1944 in Friedland, Lower Saxony.

Family
Below was the cousin of Fritz von Below, another German commander during the war. The two Generals are often confused.

Notes

References

Bibliography

External links

 

1857 births
1944 deaths
Military personnel from Gdańsk
German Army generals of World War I
People from the Province of Prussia
Generals of Infantry (Prussia)
Recipients of the Pour le Mérite (military class)
Grand Crosses of the Military Order of Max Joseph
Recipients of the Iron Cross (1914), 1st class
Otto